Thoday is a surname. People with that name include:

 David Thoday (1883-1964), British botanist, father of John
 John Thoday (1916-2008), British geneticist, son of David
 Jon Thoday (active from 1989), British television executive and businessman

See also
 

Thoday is also the real name of Thomas Braamhorst, devised by Theo